The jugular process is a quadrilateral or triangular bony plate projecting lateralward from the posterior half of the occipital condyle; it is a part of the lateral part of the occipital bone.

The jugular process is excavated in front by the jugular notch of occipital bone (which forms the posterior part of the jugular foramen). The posterolateral side of the jugular formanen is divided from the anteromedial side by the intrajugular process of occipital bone.

The jugular process serves as the insertion of the rectus capitis lateralis.

References

External links

 

Bones of the head and neck